Paul Auguste Sollier (31 August 1861 – 8 June 1933) was a French doctor and psychologist.

Life and career 
Sollier was born in Bléré, Indre-et-Loire, France. 

While largely overlooked, Paul Sollier's writings are now being re-discovered, showing an extraordinarily modern conceptual thinking. Paul Sollier (1861–1933) at the time was considered the most gifted pupil of French neurologist Jean-Martin Charcot, together with Joseph Babinski. Because of his interest in psychology, unique at the time for a neurologist, but also his opposition to the leading figure in psychiatry Pierre Janet, Sollier was never well accepted by his contemporary neurologists and psychiatrists. He could not follow an academic career and was never elected to the Académie de Médecine, despite several applications. 

His scientific and clinical interests encompassed classical neurological syndromes but also hysteria, memory, emotions and mental retardation, where he was the precursor of the development of the intellectual ratio. Already in the 1890s, he developed cognitive behavioral therapies, which he applied to his most famous patient, French novelist Marcel Proust. Proust largely inspired himself from Sollier's The Problem of Memory (1900) for his emphasis on involuntary memory in his 1913–1927 novel In Search of Lost Time. Sollier can be considered as one of the first neuropsychologists and deserves the present renewed interest in his work.

Works
 Sens musculaire, 1887.
 Du role de l'hérédité dans l'alcoolisme, 1888.
 Psychologie de l'idiot et de l'imbécile, 1890.
 Guide pratique des maladies mentales, 1893.
 Genèse et nature de l'hystérie, 1897.
 L'Hystérie et son traitement, 1901.
 Le Mécanisme des émotions. Leçons faites à l'Université nouvelle de Bruxelles, 1903.
 Les phénomènes d'autoscopie, 1903.

References
 C.-E. Curinier, Dictionnaire national des contemporains. 6 vols, 1889–1906.

External links
 

1861 births
1933 deaths
French psychologists